Natalia Vía Dufresne Pereña (born 10 June 1973) is a Spanish sport sailor.

She was born in Barcelona. She was originally an Optimist sailor, but switched to 470’s at the age of 15. She won two bronze medals in the World Championships, two Olympic silver medals (in 1992 and in 2004), with crew member, Sandra Azón. Her current crew is Laia Tutzó.

Her sister is Begoña Vía Dufresne.

Notes

References

External links
 
 

1973 births
Living people
Sportspeople from Barcelona
Spanish female sailors (sport)
Spanish people of French descent
Sailors from Catalonia
Olympic sailors of Spain
Olympic medalists in sailing
Olympic silver medalists for Spain
Sailors at the 1992 Summer Olympics – Europe
Sailors at the 2000 Summer Olympics – 470
Sailors at the 2004 Summer Olympics – 470
Sailors at the 2008 Summer Olympics – 470
Medalists at the 1992 Summer Olympics
Medalists at the 2004 Summer Olympics